Sisson Township is an inactive township in Howell County, in the U.S. state of Missouri.

Sisson Township has the name of an early plantation owner.

References

Townships in Missouri
Townships in Howell County, Missouri